Wethington is a surname. Notable people with the surname include:

Charles T. Wethington Jr. (born 1936), the tenth president of the University of Kentucky
Crawford Wethington (1904–1994), American jazz saxophonist

See also
Charles T. Wethington Jr. Building, for the University of Kentucky in Lexington, Kentucky
Ethington
Withington